The Delahaye 134 is a four-cylinder luxury automobile manufactured by Delahaye. Based on Jean François' Delahaye 135, it was produced from 1933 to 1940 (from 1936 as the 134N) and was briefly brought back by Delahaye manager Charles Weiffenbach in 1945 after hostilities ended. At the same time, the larger engined 134G also appeared. As a part of the "Plan Pons" aimed at reviving French industry, Delahaye was to focus on building luxury cars, in particular for the export markets. The lesser 134 did not suit the plan and was taken out of production by 1946, in preference to the more lucrative 135, 148, and 175 models. Most 134s built carried saloon bodywork by Autobineau, a subsidiary of Letourneur et Marchand.

The 2.15 liter engine (bore and stroke of 80 x 107 mm) of the 134 and 134N was a four-cylinder version of the 3.2 litre, four-bearing overhead valve inline-six from the 135, itself based on a lorry engine. Power was 50 hp at 3800 rpm. Like the 135, the 134s featured independent, leaf-sprung front suspension, a live rear axle, and cable operated Bendix brakes. Transmission was either a four-speed manual or a four-speed Cotal pre-selector. A total of 340 134N were built, of which about 100 post war (these are almost entirely identical to 1939 models), mainly for the domestic market.

Twenty or so of the 2.4 liter 14 CV 134G models were built in 1945–1946, only for export. However, with steel supplies savagely rationed under the government's restructuring strategy for the auto industry, the manufacturer concentrated production on larger, potentially more lucrative, 6-cylinder models such as their 135.

References

External links 
 

1930s cars
1940s cars
Delahaye vehicles
Rear-wheel-drive vehicles
Cars introduced in 1933